Reinnervation is the restoration, either by spontaneous cellular regeneration or by surgical grafting, of nerve supply to a body part from which it has been lost or damaged.

See also
 Denervation
 Neuroregeneration
 Targeted reinnervation

References

Neuroscience